Ledina Çelo (born 9 February 1977) is an Albanian singer and model. She is best known for representing Albania at the 2005 Eurovision Song Contest in Kyiv, after winning the 43rd edition of Festivali i Këngës.

Life

2003–present 

In December 2003, she hosted the 43rd edition of Festivali i Këngës, the national pre-selection competition for the Eurovision Song Contest. A year later, she participated as a contestant with the song Nesër Shkoj and eventually won the competition. She qualified for the grand final and finished in the sixteenth place. In 2006, Ledina Celo finished second in Kënga Magjike with the song "Jemi Të Huaj".

Awards 

Festivali i Këngës

|-
||2004
||"Tomorrow I Go"
|First Prize
|
|}

Kënga Magjike

|-
||2003
||"Te dua se je Ti"
|Linda Association Prize
|
|- 
||2004
||"Ne nje ishull qe nuk ekziston"
|Public Prize
|
|-
|rowspan="2"|2006
|rowspan="2"|"Jemi te huaj"
|Best Performer
|
|-
|Second Prize
|
|-
|rowspan="2"|2013
|rowspan="2"|"Gaboja"
|Best Ballad
|
|-
|Second Prize
|
|}

Videofest Awards

|-
|rowspan="2"|2005
|rowspan="2"|" Vagabond nga dashuria"
|Best Female
|
|-
|Best Editing
|
|-
|rowspan="2"|2007
|rowspan="2"|"Të ndjejë të huaj"
|Best Camera
|
|-
|Best Production
|
|}

Zhurma Show Awards

|-
||2004
|"Vagabond nga dashuria"
|Best Video 
|
|}

References 

1975 births
Living people
Musicians from Tirana
21st-century Albanian women singers
Festivali i Këngës winners
Eurovision Song Contest entrants for Albania
Eurovision Song Contest entrants of 2005
Albanian pop musicians